Syvelle R. Newton (born April 15, 1985) is a former American football wide receiver/defensive back. He played college football.

Professional career
Newton was rated the 37th best wide receiver in the 2007 NFL Draft by NFLDraftScout.com. The website also projected that he would be drafted in the seventh round or be a free agent signing. Some scouts thought that Newton was the "best athlete among offensive players eligible for the 2007 NFL Draft".

 

He signed a two-year contract with the Montreal Alouettes of the Canadian Football League, however Newton left the Alouettes’ training camp shortly after being switched again from quarterback to receiver.

Newton joined the Chicago Rush in the second half of the 2010 Arena Football League season. Despite only being on the team for five games, he finished fourth on the team in receiving, with 41 catches for 566 yards and 12 touchdowns.

He was then signed to the Philadelphia Soul in 2010 to play in their 2011 season.

References

1985 births
Living people
American football defensive backs
American football running backs
American football quarterbacks
American football wide receivers
Georgia Force players
Harrisburg Stampede players
Kansas City Command players
New Orleans VooDoo players
Philadelphia Soul players
South Carolina Gamecocks football players
High school football coaches in South Carolina
People from Marlboro County, South Carolina
Players of American football from South Carolina